The Australian Poultry Standards is the primary benchmark of exhibition poultry in Australia, covering chickens, turkey, geese, ducks and guinea fowl.

Chickens

Ducks
 Call duck.               bantam.

Geese

Turkey

Guinea fowl

References

Poultry standards
Lists of Australian and New Zealand domestic animal breeds